Peace X Peace (pronounced “peace by peace”) is a nonprofit women's organization founded in 2002 that promotes building peace through online communications.

History
Peace X Peace was founded in 2002 by Patricia Smith Melton. Following the terrorist attacks of September 11, Smith Melton gathered experts in peace and women's rights from around the world (including Isabel Allende, the Chilean novelist; Susan Collin Marks, the Australian-born co-founder of Search for Common Ground; and Fatima Gailani, the Afghan head of the Red Crescent) to elaborate a women's response to the September 11 attacks. They declared that women are the key to peace, and must stand together to claim their full power. Later in 2002 Smith Melton incorporated the organization and took a film crew around the world to interview extraordinary women. The resulting documentary, Peace by Peace: Women on the Frontlines, premiered at the United Nations on International Women's Day in 2003. It was also aired around the world and on PBS in the United States. In 2003, the organization launched a website and an online women's news service.

Operations
In fall of 2008 Dr. Pat Morris took office as executive director of Peace X Peace, and in 2010 Kim Weichel took the helm as CEO. As of June, 2011 the organization had six staff members.

Peace X Peace advocates for policies and programs that support and advance women. They are part of a civil society coalition that makes recommendations to a US Government National Action Plan for Women, Peace and Security.

Peace X Peace operates almost entirely online, hosting a private online community, as well as regularly publishing original and re-posted material on their blogs, including Voices from the Frontlines, Be the Change, and Connection Point. The organization also publishes a monthly newsletter, PeaceTimes, and sends the Weekly Blog Digest each Friday. The Peace X Peace community numbers around 18,000 mostly female members in more than 100 countries.

Peace X Peace collaborates on UN initiatives for women, including the Commission on the Status of Women, Millennium Development Goals, and UN Women, advocates on behalf of UN conventions, and participates in UN programs in the Washington DC area.

In February 2011, Peace X Peace launched a new project called "Connection Point." The goal of this project is to "link Arab and Muslim women with women from Western countries in a vibrant online community." This project involves the regular posting of articles and interviews with women from the Arab world and Muslim women, as well as compiling resources pertinent to Arab and Muslim women, and their relations with women in the west.

Every November, Peace X Peace hosts the Women, Power, and Peace Awards. Award categories include Peace Media, Peace Philanthropy, the Patricia Smith Melton Peacebuilder award, and the Community Peacebuilder award. Every other year these awards are given out in a ceremony held in Washington, DC.

Awards
 In 2002 the Isabel Allende Foundation honored Peace X Peace with the  Espiritu Award for the Pursuit of Peace
 The documentary Peace by Peace: Women on the Frontlines won the Golden Eagle Cine Award in 2004 and the Best Documentary Aurora Award in 2006
 In 2005, Religious Science International, a nonprofit based in Seattle, recognized Peace X Peace with its Golden Works Award for activities that exemplify the RSI mission, "awakening humanity to its spiritual magnificence"
 In 2006, Working Mother named it one of the 25 Best Places for Women to Work
 In 2007, Peace X Peace won the ePhilanthropy Foundation's Best Community Building/Activism Award
 In November 2008, Peace X Peace won the Technology Innovation Award from NPower Greater DC and Accenture
 In December 2008, Peace X Peace Founder Patricia Smith Melton was selected as one of OneWorld's People of 2008 and received The Rumi Peace and Dialogue Award

References

External links

Further reading 
  - includes chapter on Peace X Peace
 
 

International women's organizations
Peace organizations based in the United States